Josh Ross (born October 31, 1999) is an American football linebacker for the Baltimore Ravens of the National Football League (NFL). He played college football at Michigan.

Early life and high school
Ross grew up in Southfield, Michigan and attended St. Mary's Preparatory school. As a senior, he made 142 tackles with 20 tackles for loss, 12.5 sacks, three forced fumbles, and three fumble recoveries. Ross was rated a four-star recruit and committed to play college football at Michigan over offers from Ohio State, Michigan State and Notre Dame.

College career
Ross was a member of the Michigan Wolverines for five seasons. He played in all 13 of Michigan's games, primarily on special teams, during his freshman season. As a sophomore, Ross again played in all of the team's games and was named honorable mention All-Big Ten Conference after finishing the season with 61 tackles and one sack. He started the first three games of his junior season before suffering an ankle injury that caused him to miss the remainder of the regular season. As a senior, Ross started all six of Michigan's games during the Big Ten's COVID-19-shortened 2020 season and was again named honorable mention all-conference after making 53 tackles. Ross opted to return to Michigan for a fifth season as a graduate student. In his final season, Ross had 106 tackles with nine tackles for loss and was named third-team All-Big Ten.

Professional career
Ross signed with the Baltimore Ravens as an undrafted free agent on May 7, 2022. He made the Ravens' initial 53-man roster out of training camp. He suffered a foot injury in Week 2 and was placed on injured reserve on September 19, 2022. He was designated to return from injured reserve on December 20, 2022.

References

External links
Michigan Wolverines bio
Baltimore Ravens bio

1999 births
Living people
American football linebackers
Players of American football from Michigan
Michigan Wolverines football players
Baltimore Ravens players